Penicillium flavescens is a species of the genus of Penicillium.

See also
 List of Penicillium species

References

flavescens
Fungi described in 1956